Dolores is a city in the Soriano Department of western Uruguay.

Geography
The city is located in the west part of the Soriano's department, on the left banks of San Salvador River, about  before it discharges into the Uruguay River. It is almost entirely surrounded by the populated rural area known as Chacras de Dolores. It has a natural port and is connected with the rest of the country by Routes 21 and 96.

History
It was founded in September 1801. It had acquired the status of "Villa" (town) before the Independence of Uruguay under the name "San Salvador". On 26 November 1923, its status was elevated to "Ciudad" (city) by the Act of Ley Nº 7.652.

2016 tornado
On April 15, 2016, a major tornado struck Dolores, killing four people and injuring 200 more.

Population
In 2011, Dolores had a population of 17,174. Together with the surrounding rural inhabitants of Chacras de Dolores, they form a population centre of more than 19,000.
 
Source: Instituto Nacional de Estadística de Uruguay

Places of worship
 Our Lady of Sorrows Parish Church (Roman Catholic)
 Iglesia Evangelica (Protestant Church) 
 LDS Wards (The Church of Jesus Christ of Latter-day Saints)

References

External links
INE map of Dolores and Chacras de Dolores

Populated places in the Soriano Department